Rubing is a firm, acid-set, non-melting, fresh goat milk farmer cheese made in the Yunnan Province of China by people of the Bai and Sani (recognized as a branch of the Yi in China) minorities. Its Bai name is youdbap, meaning "goat's milk".

Production
Rubing is made by mixing heated goat's milk and a souring agent, traditionally a mixture called năiténg (奶藤; lit. 'milk vine') made from a cultivated vine.

Preparation and serving
Rubing is most often steamed with local ham or salt beef, or sometimes served pan fried with salt and chilli. It may also be stir fried with vegetables (typically a mix of broccoli and carrot), in a similar manner to how other mainland Chinese rural cuisine tends to stir-fry harder forms of tofu.photo It is also pan fried and served with alternative flavourings such as dry chilli powder, salt, and Sichuan pepper powder.

Relationship to other cheeses
Rubing is roughly similar to paneer and queso blanco, but with the aroma of fresh goat's milk.

See also
Yunnan cuisine
Rushan (cheese)
 List of goat milk cheeses

References

Chinese cheeses
Acid-set cheeses
Goat's-milk cheeses
Yunnan cuisine